Sarah Klassen (born 1932) is a Canadian writer living in Winnipeg, Manitoba. Klassen's first volume of poetry, Journey to Yalta, was awarded the Gerald Lampert Memorial Award in 1989. Klassen is the recipient of Canadian Authors Association Award for Poetry and Klassen's novel, The Wittenbergs, was awarded the Margaret McWilliams Award for popular history.

Career  

Sarah Klassen was born in Winnipeg, Manitoba, and currently resides there. She holds a Bachelor of Arts degree and a Bachelor of Education degree from the University of Winnipeg. Sarah Klassen taught English in the public school system in Winnipeg, and at summer institutes in Lithuania and Ukraine. Klassen has been recognized as part of a flourishing of Mennonite novelists and poets emerging in the 1980s. Much of Klassen's writing reflects creatively on the experiences and locations of Russian Mennonite settlements in the early part of the twentieth century, a topic relayed to her in stories by her own mother.

Bibliography

Novels 
The Wittenbergs, Winnipeg: Turnstone Press (2013)
The Russian Daughter Winnipeg: CMU Press (2022)

Poetry 
Journey to Yalta Winnipeg: Turnstone Press (1988)
Violence and Mercy Windsor: Netherlandic Press (1991)
Borderwatch Windsor: Netherlandic Press (1993)
Dangerous Elements Kingston: Quarry Press (1998)
Simone Weil: Songs for Hunger and Love Hamilton: Wolsak and Wynn (1999)
A Curious Beatitude Winnipeg: The Muses' Company (2006)
Monstrance Winnipeg: Turnstone Press (2012)
Tree of Life Winnipeg: Turnstone Press (2020)

Short Stories 
The Peony Season Winnipeg: Turnstone Press (2000)
A Feast of Longing Regina, SK: Coteau Books (2007)

Awards
 Winner, Margaret McWilliams Award for Popular History for The Wittenbergs, 2013.

Weblinks
 Giessener Elektronische Bibliothek: Julia Michael, Narrating communities: constructing and challenging Mennonite Canadian identities through narrative, thesis Universität Gießen 2017, therein Demythologizing Stories of Martyrdom as Narratives of Victimization in Sarah Klassen's "Dangerous Elements", pp 59 – 73

References

1932 births
Living people
20th-century Canadian poets
21st-century Canadian novelists
21st-century Canadian poets
Canadian women short story writers
Canadian women novelists
Canadian women poets
Canadian Mennonites
Writers from Winnipeg
20th-century Canadian women writers
21st-century Canadian women writers
20th-century Canadian short story writers
21st-century Canadian short story writers
Mennonite writers
Mennonite poets